, known by the pen name , was a Japanese manga artist and essayist known for his social criticism as well as the realism of his drawing style and the characters in his scenarios. He was considered a pioneer of the controversial gekiga genre of adult-oriented manga.

The son of the Japanese proletarian painter Toki Okamoto, his dream to become an artist equal with his father started when he became a kamishibai artist. He is also known for his work published in the early issues of the manga anthology magazine Garo in 1964, which he began publishing so as to serialize his comic Kamui.

Early life
Shirato was born in Tokyo, Japan. In Shirato's childhood his father was active in the proletarian culture movement, being one of the few people to be photographed with the tortured corpse of proletarian leader Takiji Kobayashi. As he grew up he experienced the rancor of the war years, and it is said that these grim emotions come out in the nihilistic society portrayed in his works.

Shirato developed his artistic style through painting picture-card shows (kamishibai) after finishing middle school at 18. He was influenced by the ukiyo-e of the pre-Meiji period, but differed in his portrayal of action in a multi-panel "slow motion" style unique to his manga. His style of action portrayal came from the tension building techniques inherent in the performance aspect of Kami-shibai.

Manga career
Shirato started his career as a professional manga artist in 1957 with Ninja Bugeichō (Ninja Martial Arts Handbook, published 1959–62), a historically-based ninja-themed manga that captured the attention of students and intellectuals of the time. This violent epic tale set in Japan's "Warring States" (Sengoku) period was seen by many readers and critics as a thinly-veiled allegory for the ongoing Anpo protests against the US-Japan Security Treaty (although Shirato himself later denied this was his intention). Regardless of Shirato's true intentions, the manga seemed to correspond to the feelings and experiences student protesters were going through at the time, and Ninja Bugeichō developed an avid following among left-leaning student activists. Because its adult themes and graphic violence, Ninja Bugeichō has been cited as one of the first examples of gekiga, or serious manga aimed specifically at adult audiences rather than children.

Kamui Den, the first series published in Garo, can be considered his most important manga work. It is the story of Kamui, a ninja who leaves an organization that pursues him and clearly sees the true nature of the Edo period and the discrimination that existed in the feudal system. Shirato's works are primarily historical dramas that focus on ninja, present a historical record of Japan, and criticize oppression, discrimination, and exploitation.

Some of Shirato's work have been adapted as anime series and films, including Ninja Bugeichō, adapted by Nagisa Oshima as Band of Ninja in 1967, an unusual film consisting only of images from the manga and voiceovers with no animation. Some works have received attention in the United States, such as Kamui Gaiden (1982-2000), which was partially translated in 1987 by Viz Media as The Legend of Kamui, but most of his work remain relatively unknown outside Japan.

Death
He died on October 8, 2021 at the age of 89 due to aspiration pneumonia. The news of his death was announced by the editorial department of Big Comic on October 26, 2021. It was also reported that his brother Tetsuji Okamoto (岡本 鉄二氏, Okamoto Tetsuji) died four days later of interstitial pneumonia.

Works
 Kogarashi Kenshi (1957)
 Shiryō (1958)
 Kieyuku Shōjo (1959)
 Ninja Bugeichō (1959–1962)
 Kaze no Ishimaru (1960)
 Seton's Wild Animals (1961–1964)
 Sasuke (1961–1966)
 Kamui series (1964–1986)
 Watari (1965–1966)

References

1932 births
2021 deaths
Japanese communists
Japanese Marxists
Manga artists from Tokyo
People from Tokyo
Gekiga creators